The Great Diamond Robbery is a 1954 American comedy film directed by Robert Z. Leonard and starring Red Skelton, James Whitmore, Cara Williams and Reginald Owen. It was produced and distributed by Metro-Goldwyn-Mayer.

Plot
A diamond potentially worth $2 million, the "Blue Goddess," must be cut. A New York City jeweler, Bainbridge Gibbons, has an expert lined up, but his own diamond cutter, Ambrose C. Park, strongly urges Gibbons to let him do the cutting.

On a park bench, Ambrose explains to a stranger that he places a newspaper ad once a year, on his birthday, and sits here hoping to be reunited with the parents who abandoned him in this very spot as an infant. He doesn't even know his real name; he was dubbed "Ambrose Central Park" at an orphanage.

Ambrose is arrested after inadvertently becoming drunk in public. A shyster lawyer, Remlick, offers to help for $400, then takes a greater interest when Ambrose offers to pay much more if his parents could be located. A couple of con artists become involved, with nightclub dancer Maggie Drumman and her mother Emily hired to pretend to be Ambrose's real sister and mom.

After the crooks try to steal the diamond, Ambrose accidentally cuts it in half, perfectly. He swallows one half, Maggie the other. As the crooks are taken away, Ambrose and Maggie go to have their stomachs pumped. A romantic attraction develops and all is forgiven.

Cast

 Red Skelton as Ambrose C. Park
 Cara Williams as Maggie
 James Whitmore as Remlick
 Kurt Kasznar as Tony Midelli/Louie
 Dorothy Stickney as Emily 
 George Mathews as	Duke Fargoh
 Reginald Owen as Bainbridge Gibbons
 Harry Bellaver as Herb
 Connie Gilchrist as Blonde
 Steven Geray as Van Goosen
 Sig Arno as Mr. Sahutsky
 Olan Soule as Mr. Heinsdorfer
 Jean Fenwick as Secretary
 Matt Moore as Preacher 
 Anna Q. Nilsson as 	Nurse 
 Pat O'Malley as 	Policeman

Reception
According to MGM records the movie earned $501,000 in the US and Canada and $201,000 elsewhere, making a loss to the studio of $426,000.

References

External links
 
 The Great Diamond Robbery at TCMDB
 
 

Metro-Goldwyn-Mayer films
1950s crime comedy films
Films directed by Robert Z. Leonard
American crime comedy films
1954 comedy films
1954 films
American black-and-white films
1950s English-language films
1950s American films